Valchev is a Bulgarian surname. Notable people with the surname include:

Enyu Valchev (born 1936), Bulgarian sport wrestler
 Georgi Valchev (footballer, born 1991), Bulgarian footballer
 Georgi Valchev (footballer, born 2000), Bulgarian footballer
Mihail Valchev (born 1956), Bulgarian footballer and manager

Bulgarian-language surnames